David Bowe is a character actor in American movies and television.  His best-known role is that of George Newman's sidekick, Bob, in 1989's UHF. His other film credits include A Few Good Men (1992), Made in America (1993, starring Whoopi Goldberg), Heavyweights (1995), The Rock (1996), Kicking & Screaming (2005), and Rubber (2010).

Bowe also had a recurring role on the short-lived television series Life... and Stuff, which aired in 1997 and co-starred Andrea Martin.

Personal life 
Bowe was born in Los Angeles. Bowe is a nephew of Rosemarie Bowe and Robert Stack.

Selected filmography

Film

Television

References

External links

A photograph, from UHF

Living people
American male film actors
Place of birth missing (living people)
American male television actors
1964 births
20th-century American male actors